2019 Basketbol Süper Ligi (BSL) Playoffs was the final phase of the 2018–19 Basketbol Süper Ligi season. The playoffs started on 21 May 2019. Fenerbahçe Beko were the defending champions.

The eight highest placed teams of the regular season qualified for the playoffs. In the quarter-finals a best-of-three was played, in the semi-finals a best-of-five and in the finals a best-of-seven playoff format was used.

Anadolu Efes competed against Fenerbahçe Beko in the finals, won the series 4-3 and got their 14th championship.

Bracket

Quarterfinals

(1) Anadolu Efes vs. (8) Banvit

(2) Fenerbahçe Beko  vs. (7) Türk Telekom

(3) Tofaş vs.  (6) Beşiktaş Sompo Japan

(4) Galatasaray Doğa Sigorta vs. (5) Gaziantep Basketbol

Semifinals

(1) Anadolu Efes vs. (4) Galatasaray Doğa Sigorta

(2) Fenerbahçe Beko vs. (3) Tofaş

Finals

(1) Anadolu Efes vs. (2) Fenerbahçe Beko

References
BSL.org.tr
TBF.org.tr
TBLStat.net League History, 2018-19 Season

Playoff
Turkish Basketball Super League Playoffs